Liliya Foatovna Nurutdinova (born 15 December 1963) is a retired middle-distance runner who represented the Soviet Union and the Unified Team.

Her greatest achievement was the 1992 Olympic silver medal when she ran the 800 m in 1:55.99 min, her personal best time. She looked to have the race won, but, tiring, she moved away from the curb on the stretch, and was passed on the inside by gold medalist Ellen van Langen 50 metres from the finish line. She is also the 1991 World 800-metre champion where she held off Ana Quirot, Ella Kovacs, and Maria Mutola in a finish which saw Kovacs fall, the women jammed together, and the top four separated by less than two-tenths of a second. She was born in Naberezhnye Chelny, Tatar Autonomous Soviet Socialist Republic.

Doping ban
At the 1993 World Championships in Athletics Nurutdinova tested positive for the anabolic steroid stanozolol, and she was subsequently disqualified and handed a 4-year ban from sport.   She retired from the sport immediately after.

International competitions

See also
List of doping cases in athletics

References

External links 
 
 
 

1963 births
Living people
Russian female middle-distance runners
Soviet female middle-distance runners
Olympic female middle-distance runners
Olympic athletes of the Unified Team
Olympic gold medalists for the Unified Team
Olympic silver medalists for the Unified Team
Olympic gold medalists in athletics (track and field)
Olympic silver medalists in athletics (track and field)
Athletes (track and field) at the 1992 Summer Olympics
Medalists at the 1992 Summer Olympics
Goodwill Games medalists in athletics
Competitors at the 1990 Goodwill Games
World Athletics Championships athletes for the Soviet Union
World Athletics Championships athletes for Russia
World Athletics Championships medalists
World Athletics Championships winners
European Athletics Championships medalists
Russian Athletics Championships winners
Doping cases in athletics
Russian sportspeople in doping cases
Tatar people of Russia